Fabian Lokaj (born 23 August 1996) is an Albanian professional footballer who plays as a forward for FC Köniz.

Club career
Ahead of the 2019–20 season, Lokaj returned to FC Köniz.

International career
Lokaj received his first Albania under-17 call-up by manager Džemal Mustedanagić for a friendly tournament developed in August 2012 in Romania.

References

External links

1996 births
Living people
Association football forwards
Albanian footballers
Albania youth international footballers
FC Thun players
FC Köniz players
FC Koper players
ACS Poli Timișoara players
FC Chiasso players
CS Gaz Metan Mediaș players
BSV Schwarz-Weiß Rehden players
VfL Oldenburg players
Slovenian PrvaLiga players
Liga I players
Regionalliga players
Albanian expatriate footballers
Albanian expatriate sportspeople in Switzerland
Albanian expatriate sportspeople in Slovenia
Albanian expatriate sportspeople in Romania
Albanian expatriate sportspeople in Germany
Expatriate footballers in Switzerland
Expatriate footballers in Slovenia
Expatriate footballers in Romania
Expatriate footballers in Germany